Jack Russell (born 1945) is an Irish former hurler and coach who played for club sides Ballyhea and Blackrock. He played for the Cork senior hurling team at various times over a seven-year period, during which time he usually lined out as a centre-back.

Russell began his hurling career at club level with Ballyhea. He broke onto the club's top adult team in the early 1960s before joining the Blackrock club at the end of the decade. Russell partnered Pat Moylan at midfield on Blackrock's All-Ireland Club Championship-winning team in 1974. Russell subsequently returned to the Ballyhea club winning a Cork Junior Championship medal in 1976 and a Cork Intermediate Championship medal in 1980. His was also selected for the Avondhu divisional team with whom he won a Cork Senior Championship medal in 1966.

At inter-county level, Russell was part of the Cork under-21 team that won the All-Ireland Championship in 1966. He joined the Cork senior team in 1966 before being appointed captain of the team for the 1967 Munster Championship. From his debut, Russell struggled to secure a regular place on the starting fifteen, however, he was part of the Cork intermediate team that won the All-Ireland Championship in 1969. He returned to the Cork senior team for the final time for the 1973 Munster Championship.

In retirement from playing Russell became involved in team management and coaching. He was joint coach of the Avondhu senior hurling team that won the 1996 Cork Senior Championship.

Honours

Player
Ballyhea
Cork Intermediate Hurling Championship (1): 1980
Cork Junior Hurling Championship (1): 1976
North Cork Junior A Hurling Championship (3): 1965, 1975, 1976

Blackrock
All-Ireland Senior Club Hurling Championship (1): 1973-74
Munster Senior Club Hurling Championship (1): 1973-74
Cork Senior Hurling Championship (1): 1973

Avondhu
Cork Senior Hurling Championship (1): 1966

Cork
All-Ireland Intermediate Hurling Championship (1): 1969
Munster Intermediate Hurling Championship (1): 1969
All-Ireland Under-21 Hurling Championship (1): 1966
Munster Under-21 Hurling Championship (1): 1966

Manager
Avondhu
Cork Senior Hurling Championship (1): 1996

References

1945 births
Living people
Avondhu hurlers
Ballyhea hurlers
Blackrock National Hurling Club hurlers
Cork inter-county hurlers
Hurling coaches
Hurling managers